Gerry Lee was an animal impersonator.

He appeared as a castaway on the BBC Radio programme Desert Island Discs on 19 January 1963.

References 

Year of birth missing
Place of birth missing
Year of death missing
Place of death missing
Animal impersonators